William Coxe is the name of:

William Coxe (historian) (1747–1828), English historian
William Coxe Jr. (1762–1831), U.S. Representative from New Jersey
William Coxe (MP) for Southwark (UK Parliament constituency)

See also
William Cox (disambiguation)